Amt Beetzsee is an Amt ("collective municipality") in the district of Potsdam-Mittelmark, in Brandenburg, Germany. Its seat is in Beetzsee.

The Amt Beetzsee consists of the following municipalities:
Beetzsee
Beetzseeheide
Havelsee
Päwesin
Roskow

Demography

References

Beetzsee
Potsdam-Mittelmark